Valentin Abramovich Yudashkin (born October 14, 1963) is a Russian fashion designer.

Career 
Born in Moscow Oblast, Yudashkin came to prominence during the 1980s, dressing Raisa Gorbacheva. He is considered the first post-Soviet designer to bring a contemporary Russian look to the international fashion world, wowing critics with sumptuous theatricality as well as wearable styles.

His designs have been exhibited in museums such as the Musée de la mode et du textile in Paris, the California Museum of Fashion in Los Angeles, the Metropolitan Museum in New York, and the State Historical Museum in Moscow. In 2010, he redesigned Russia's military uniforms, creating 85 designs to dress all branches of the Russian armed services.

References

External links

Official site

1963 births
Living people
Russian Jews
Russian fashion designers
Russian artists
People from Odintsovsky District
Academic staff of Moscow State Textile University
People's Artists of Russia
Corresponding Members of the Russian Academy of Arts
Full Members of the Russian Academy of Arts
Recipients of the Order of Honour (Russia)
Chevaliers of the Légion d'honneur
Chevaliers of the Ordre des Arts et des Lettres